Pumpkin Spring is a geothermal heated mineral water hot spring located in the Grand Canyon in Arizona.

The spring gets its name due to the bright orange mineral and organic deposits that have accumulated on the flowstone, giving it the appearance of a huge pumpkin. At the surface, the spring morphology is a mineralized carbonate mound-form. The spring water emerges from within the pool which is surrounded by a travertine that has formed around the source. The water flows over the left bank lip of the mound down to the river at the upstream end of pool into the downstream side of the river.

Water profile

The hot spring water has a mineral content that includes high levels of arsenic (1100 mg per 1 liter of water), as well as zinc, lead, and copper. The temperature of the water emerges at 23°C, at a rate of 200 milliliters per second, and has a Ph of 7.0.

Location
The spring is located at the bottom of the Grand Canyon near the shore of the Colorado River near mile 212.9.

See also
 List of hot springs in the United States
 List of hot springs in the world

References

Hot springs of Arizona
Grand Canyon